Novalaetesia is a genus of South Pacific dwarf spiders that was first described by Alfred Frank Millidge in 1988.

Species
 it contains two species:
Novalaetesia anceps Millidge, 1988 (type) – New Zealand
Novalaetesia atra Blest & Vink, 2003 – New Zealand

See also
 List of Linyphiidae species (I–P)

References

Araneomorphae genera
Linyphiidae
Spiders of New Zealand